Catherine Bohart (born Catherine Murphy 13 August 1988) is an Irish stand-up comedian, writer and actor based in the United Kingdom.

Early life
Bohart grew up in Clonsilla, Fingal, part of the greater Dublin area, the daughter of a Catholic deacon. She has obsessive–compulsive disorder and was hospitalised in St Patrick's University Hospital for four months. She studied law at UCD for one year before dropping out. She then studied French and History at Trinity College. Bohart then went on to the Royal Central School of Speech and Drama in London, receiving an MA in Acting for Screen. Before entering stand-up comedy, Bohart had been involved in debate throughout high school, and college even taking on a job in debate education during her early days as a stand up.

Career
After struggling as an actress, Bohart transitioned to stand-up in 2014. She was a finalist for the 2016 BBC New Comedy Award and for the 2018 Leicester Mercury Comedian of the Year.

Catherine has written for The Now Show, The News Quiz and Frankie Boyle's New World Order, and has supported Ellie Taylor and Nish Kumar on tour.

Bohart had her professional breakthrough at the 2018 Edinburgh Festival with her show, Immaculate. She then took the show to London and on a national tour. Her second show, Lemon, premiered at the 2019 Edinburgh Festival, with tour dates in the UK and Ireland to follow.

She has appeared on TV on The Blame Game, The Stand Up Sketch Show, The Mash Report, Roast Battle, 8 Out of 10 Cats, Alan Davies: As Yet Untitled, Jon Richardson: Ultimate Worrier, Richard Osman's House of Games, and Mock the Week. She is a frequent guest on Deborah Frances-White's The Guilty Feminist podcast. In 2019, Bohart hosted the "Funny from the Fringe" podcast for BBC Radio 4 Extra. In 2020, during the COVID-19 Pandemic, Bohart and her girlfriend, at the time, Sarah Keyworth made a podcast about "what makes relationships work" entitled "You'll Do". During lockdown in the United Kingdom, Catherine Bohart, along with Helen Bauer, and Andrew White started an online comedy program in which audience members could purchase tickets through Bohart's personal website to access the online comedy set either through Zoom or YouTube livestream. The comedy program is called "Gigless". "Gigless" won the Chortle Award for Legend of Lockdown.

Bohart currently co-hosts podcast Trusty Hogs with fellow comedian Helen Bauer.

Personal life

Bohart is bisexual. She previously dated Sarah Keyworth, a fellow stand-up comedian. They met in 2015 and lived together in Kilburn, London, eventually breaking up in 2020.

References

External links

Irish women comedians
Living people
1988 births
Bisexual women
Bisexual comedians
Irish LGBT comedians
Alumni of the Royal Central School of Speech and Drama
Irish stand-up comedians
21st-century Irish comedians
21st-century Irish LGBT people